A margarita is a cocktail.

Margarita or Margaritas may also refer to:

Film and television 
 Margarita (TV series), a 2007 Philippine drama
 Margarita (Zee TV), a 1997 Indian romance
 Margarita (2012 film), a Canadian comedy–drama
 Margarita (2016 film), a Peruvian comedy

Life forms 
 Margarita (gastropod), a sea snails genus
 Felis margarita, the Sand Cat
 Margarita (vegetable), a sweet potato cultivar

People 
 Margarita (cartoonist) (1921–1999), American creator of the Little Reggie comic strip
 Margarita (given name), including other people and fictional characters so named
 Margarita (Master and Margarita), a fictional witch created by Mikhail Bulgakov

Places

Americas 
 Margarita, Panama, a suburb of Colón
 Margarita, Bolívar, Colombia
 Isla Margarita, a Venezuelan island 
 Margarita Province, northern Venezuela

Europe 
 Margarita, Piedmont, northwestern Italy
 Margarita, Álava, a hamlet in Spain's Basque Country

Songs
 "Margarita" (Sleepy Brown song), 2006
 "Margarita" (Valery Leontiev song), 1990
 "Margarita", by Elodie, 2019
 "Margarita", by Jack Ross, 1962
 "Margarita", by Traveling Wilburys from Traveling Wilburys Vol. 1, 1988
 "Margarita", by Wilkins, 1988

Other uses 
 Margaritas (restaurant), an American chain of Tex-Mex eateries
 310 Margarita, a main-belt asteroid

See also

 Las Margaritas (disambiguation)
 Margaret (disambiguation)
 Margaritaville (disambiguation)
 Margarite
 Margherita (disambiguation)
 Marguerite (disambiguation)
 Santa Margarita (disambiguation)
 Infanta Margarita, a painting by Spanish painter Diego Velázquez
 Pizza Margherita, a pizza made with tomatoes, mozzarella, and basil